The Walrus is a comedic supervillain appearing in American comic books published by Marvel Comics. He is the enemy of Spider-Man and Frog-Man.

Publication history
Walrus first appeared in The Defenders #131 (May 1984) and was created by J.M. DeMatteis, Peter Gillis, and Alan Kupperberg.

Fictional character biography
The Walrus is a supervillain and foe of Spider-Man. He wears a costume that resembles a walrus. Despite being physically strong, he proves to be completely inept at villainy. While most supervillains are interested in stealing money or taking over the world, but just like any other monsters (e.g., kaiju), the Walrus was content with mindless property damage; reminiscent of the Hulk. He considered his role as a supervillain as that of a "mass-destructionist". The man who would eventually become the Walrus was once a taxicab driver named Hubert Carpenter (a reference to "The Walrus and the Carpenter" poem from Through the Looking-Glass). Hubert's uncle Humbert (a mad scientist/eccentric janitor) used devious experimental technology to endow Hubert with the attributes of a walrus that would surely make him into an eminent supervillain. Hubert, now with the "proportionate speed, strength and agility of a walrus", started causing havoc. He fought the New Defenders and the second Frog-Man before collapsing.

Then he teamed with the deadly and nefarious White Rabbit, forming the Terrible Two. They fought Spider-Man and were easily beaten. One of their common goals was to murder Frog-Man, who had humiliated them both in the past. However, it was soon revealed that Frog-Man had little to worry about, as the Walrus is the sort of supervillain that has to wear velcro shoes in order to avoid accidentally tying his shoes to each other. The Walrus is not the smartest villain, as he tends to make the most stupid remarks, which even made Spider-Man laugh uncontrollably at him, allowing the Walrus to punch and knock him down. The fact that the Walrus also wears a large rainbow "W" on the front of his costume also tends to make his enemies laugh at him.

The Walrus later appears with Mr. Fish in an exotic nightclub where he is seen admiring an overweight dancer.

During the Fear Itself storyline, Deadpool sees the chaos caused by the Worthy and manipulates Walrus into thinking that he has been chosen to wield a magical hammer so that he can improve his security consolation business. However, his plan goes awry when the hammer turns out to be the property of the Moon-Born, a group of werewolves. The hammer exhibits special properties under the full moon which Deadpool discovers when he engages the Walrus in battle. Deadpool tricks Walrus into entering the windowless basement of a sheriff's office where the hammer became powerless and he could take advantage of the sheriff's weapon's cache.

Walrus partners again with White Rabbit as well as the new Goldbug for a plan that involves tampering with New York City's drinking water. The three are defeated by Spider-Woman and taken to a new supervillain prison, the Cellar, which is secretly run by Regent. Once incarcerated, Walrus and Ox are separated from the other prisoners and seemingly killed when they are sealed in power-siphoning tubes by Regent's servant Dr. Shannon Stillwell. Walrus survives and is later released after Regent's defeat.

He was later subsequently abducted and placed in Murderworld by Arcade, alongside other captives. Walrus was later rescued by Gwenpool with the help of Deadpool.

During the Hunted storyline, Walrus is among the animal-themed characters that are captured by Taskmaster and Black Ant for Kraven the Hunter's Great Hunt that is sponsored by Arcade's company Arcade Industries. Walrus watches the fight between Spider-Man and Scorpion until the Hunter-Bots created by Arcade Industries arrive. Walrus runs from the Hunter-Bots when the Great Hunt begins.

Powers and abilities
Hubert Carpenter has claimed to have the proportionate speed, strength, and agility of a walrus. The Walrus possesses some measure of superhuman strength, agility and endurance. He was actually able to hit Spider-Man with sufficient force to knock him flying, rip a metal lamp post in half and withstand razor sharp and explosive carrots fired at him by the White Rabbit as a test. However, on another occasion, Spider-Man was able to defeat the Walrus by flicking him with his index finger, which knocked him out. The Walrus also has the (unintended) ability to distract his enemies by making them laugh uncontrollably with his stupid remarks.

The Walrus was mutagenically altered by his uncle with walrus DNA which would presumably add certain walrus characteristics to his physiology, such as a layer of blubber to keep him warm in freezing water and the ability to hold his breath for a much longer time than a human. While none of these abilities would be very useful to a supervillain who never goes anywhere near water, the layer of blubber could explain his resistance to injury.

The Walrus was noticeably unintelligent but was unusually good at crossword puzzles.

Reception
 In 2022, CBR.com ranked Walrus 6th in their "Spider-Man's 10 Funniest Villains" list.

References

External links
 Walrus at Marvel Wiki
 Walrus at Comic Vine
 

Marvel Comics supervillains
Fictional pinnipeds
Fictional taxi drivers
Marvel Comics characters with superhuman strength
Marvel Comics hybrids
Marvel Comics mutates
Comics characters introduced in 1984
Characters created by J. M. DeMatteis